Gerardo Ariel Morales Santos, more commonly known as Karibito, born September 20, 1975 in Montevideo) is a Uruguayan football midfielder.

External links
Tenfiel Digital Profile 

Montevideo Wanderers F.C. players
Living people
1975 births
Association football midfielders
Uruguayan footballers
Grasshopper Club Zürich players
FC Wil players